The Albanian passport (Albanian: Pasaporta e Shqipërisë) is a travel document issued by the Ministry of Interior to Albanian citizens to enable them to travel abroad. They are also used as proof of identity within the country, along with the Albanian ID card.

The Albanian biometric passport meets all standards set by International Civil Aviation Organization.

The passport costs 7,500 lekë (€60) and is valid for 10 years.

Biometric passport
Biometric passports and biometric ID cards started to be issued on 24 May 2009. The switch to a biometric passport was one of the conditions for the Schengen Area visa liberalisation for Albanians. On 8 November 2010 the Council of the European Union approved visa-free travel to the EU for citizens of Albania. The decision entered into force on 15 December 2010.

To get a passport, Albanian citizens go to the local post office to pay the fee and then go to the Registry office of the municipality. There the person is photographed, and fingerprints digitized. The data collected is sent to the center of production in Tirana. The way of producing the new Albanian e-Passport is made in front of a single civil servant (personal identification, photographing, finding fingerprints, and digital signature) makes this document one of the most reliable and advanced in the world.

Since March 2011, biometric passports and identity cards can also be requested at Albanian consulates in Greece and Italy to serve immigrants who live there.

Physical appearance
The data page of the passport is from rigid polycarbonate plastic and contains a microchip embedded in which are stored biometric data of the holder including fingerprints, photo and signature. The data is extracted from the chip with wireless RFID technology.

The photo on the page can be scanned and is replied by side and it is UV reactive. It has an alphanumeric code at the bottom of the data page which is machine-readable with optical scanners. The code includes microprinting, holographic images, images visible only with UV light, filigree and other details.

The data is written in Albanian and English. Previously, from 1991 to circa 2002, passports used Albanian and French.

History
The first Albanian passports were issued in the 1920s, during the consolidation of the Albanian state. During the communist period, from 1945 to 1991, Albania did not allow its citizens to travel abroad and did not issue ordinary passports, with only a limited number of diplomatic and service passports being issued. Since 1991, passports have been issued to any Albanian citizen who requests one.

 From 1991 to 1996, passports were red and did not contain any safety features, if not a dry stamp on the photo. The data was written by hand. It still had the Albanian communist coat of arms.
 From 1996 until 2002, passport were brown and had the first security elements, with the data page and the photo being laminated. The data was written by machine. They were manufactured by a Canadian company.
 From 2002 to 2009, passports were red and had safety standards and anti-counterfeiting features, similar to the biometric passport, except without the microchip. They were manufactured by the German firm Bundesdruckerei.
 Since 2009, biometric passports are burgundy, in line with guidelines set by the European Union. They are manufactured by the French company Sagem Sécurité.

Visa requirements

Visa requirements for Albanian citizens are administrative entry restrictions by the authorities of other nations placed on citizens of Albania.

 Albanian citizens had visa-free or visa on arrival access to 115 countries and territories, ranking the Albanian passport 53rd in terms of travel freedom according to the Henley Passport Index.

The Albanian passport is one of the 5 passports with the most improved rating globally since 2006 in terms of number of countries that its holders may visit without a visa.

Gallery

See also

Albanian identity card 
Visa requirements for Albanian citizens
List of passports
List of diplomatic missions in Albania
List of diplomatic missions of Albania
Foreign relations of Albania
Border crossings of Albania

References

External links
 Aleat Official Website
 Ministria e Punëve të Jashtme / Ministry of Foreign Affairs of Albania
 Ministria e Punëve të Brendshme / Ministry of Internal Affairs of Albania
 Policia e Shtetit / Albanian State Police

Passports by country
Identity documents of Albania